The Raleigh Express was a soccer club that competed in the United Soccer Leagues from 1993 to 2000. Based in Raleigh, North Carolina, the club started as the Raleigh Flyers in the USISL before moving to the A-League in 1997. In 1999, the club was renamed the Express, and in 2000, became the Raleigh Capital Express. They would become the inaugural winners of the Southern Derby competition, and shortly thereafter folded.

Year-by-year

Players

Defunct soccer clubs in North Carolina
Sports in Raleigh, North Carolina
USISL teams
A-League (1995–2004) teams
1993 establishments in North Carolina
Association football clubs established in 1993
2000 disestablishments in North Carolina
Association football clubs disestablished in 2000